Tarasovka is a rural locality (a selo) in Krasnolimanskoye Rural Settlement, Paninsky District, Voronezh Oblast, Russia. The population was 109 as of 2010.

Geography 
Tarasovka is located on the Tamlyk River, 43 km southwest of Panino (the district's administrative centre) by road. Barsuchye is the nearest rural locality.

References 

Rural localities in Paninsky District